The 43rd General Assembly of Prince Edward Island was in session from September 25, 1935, to April 21, 1939. The Liberal Party led by Walter Lea formed the government, winning all the seats in the legislature. Thane Campbell became Premier and party leader following Lea's death in 1936.

Stephen Hessian was elected speaker.

There were five sessions of the 43rd General Assembly:

Members

Kings

Prince

Queens

Notes:

References
  Election results for the Prince Edward Island Legislative Assembly, 1935-07-23
 O'Handley, Kathryn Canadian Parliamentary Guide, 1994 

Terms of the General Assembly of Prince Edward Island
1935 establishments in Prince Edward Island
1939 disestablishments in Prince Edward Island